Timothy Peter White (born July 9, 1949) is a retired academic administrator and kinesiologist. He served as the chancellor of the California State University system from December 2012 to December 2020. He was the chancellor of the Riverside campus of the University of California from 2008 to 2012.

Academic background
White's academic background is in physiology, kinesiology, and human biodynamics, with an emphasis on work in muscle plasticity, injury, and aging.

He was a first-generation college student who attended public institutions in California. He began his college career at Diablo Valley Community College in Pleasant Hill, then received his B.A. from Fresno State University, his master's degree from Cal State Hayward, and earned his Ph.D. at UC Berkeley. 

After earning his Ph.D., White spent two years as a post-doctoral scholar in physiology at the University of Michigan before starting his academic career at Ann Arbor.

Career
White held positions as professor and chair of the Department of Human Biodynamics at UC Berkeley, and as professor and chair of the Department of Movement Science and research scientist in the Institute of Gerontology at the University of Michigan. He served at Oregon State University in Corvallis as provost and executive vice president, with an interim appointment 

White was named the 16th president of the University of Idaho in February 2004, and took office  His leadership on the Moscow campus entailed reinvesting resources in support of five key academic priorities: science and technology, liberal arts and sciences, entrepreneurial innovation, the environment, and sustainable design and lifestyle.

In 2012 he became chancellor of the 23-campus California State University system - the largest 4-year public university system in the United States. He launched Graduation Initiative 2025, aimed at increasing graduation rates for first-time and transfer students. In 2019 CSU reported that graduation rates for these groups had hit an all-time high. In October 2019 White announced that he would retire effective June 30, 2020.

Personal
Born in Buenos Aires, Argentina, White immigrated to Canada and then to California with his parents when he was young. He was the first in his family to go to college. In May 2011 he appeared on the CBS show Undercover Boss.

During his transition to Idaho in 2004, White had unplanned heart surgery in late May in Corvallis. Experiencing chest pains, he checked himself into Good Samaritan Hospital, had a heart attack, and was rushed into emergency quintuple bypass surgery. His recovery delayed his start in Moscow from July

Awards and honors
Partial list of awards and honors
 2022 Clark Kerr Award for distinguished leadership in higher education from the UC Berkeley Academic Senate
 1999 - 2000 President, American Academy of Kinesiology and Physical Education
 1998 American College of Sports Medicine Citation Award
 1997 Alumni of the year, Fresno State University
 1994 - 1995 President, American College of Sports Medicine
 1992 Fellow, American Academy of Kinesiology and Physical Education
 1989 Sigma Xi
 1983 Fellow, American College of Sports Medicine
 1981 American College of Sports Medicine New Investigator Award
 1970 Graduated magna cum laude, Fresno State University

References

Chancellors of the University of California, Riverside
University of California, Riverside faculty
Chancellors of the California State University System
Living people
People from Buenos Aires
Argentine emigrants to the United States
University of California, Berkeley alumni
California State University, Fresno alumni
California State University, East Bay alumni
University of Michigan faculty
Presidents of Oregon State University
University of Idaho faculty
1949 births
Diablo Valley College alumni
People from Contra Costa County, California
Presidents of the University of Idaho
Participants in American reality television series